The West Iron County School District is one of two school districts in Iron County, Michigan (the other is the Forest Park School District in Crystal Falls, Michigan). Their mascot is the Wykon. The schools include Stambaugh Elementary School and West Iron County Middle and High School.

External links
West Iron County Schools website

School districts in Michigan
Education in Iron County, Michigan